Sturanyella carolinarum is a species of land snail with an operculum, a terrestrial gastropod mollusk in the family Helicinidae, the helicinids.

Distribution
This species is endemic to Micronesia.

References

Helicinidae
Fauna of Micronesia
Taxonomy articles created by Polbot